Patient Charumbira (born 11 November 1987) is a Zimbabwean cricketer. He made his first-class debut for Zimbabwe A on 17 June 2006.

References

External links
 

1987 births
Living people
Zimbabwean cricketers
Masvingo cricketers
Southern Rocks cricketers
Southerns (Zimbabwe) cricketers
Sportspeople from Gweru